The .PK2 file extension is used by Silkroad Online , a MMORPG developed by Joymax. Even though it is similarly named and used, this file format is incompatible with the file formats used by the Quake engine. The .pk2 file extension is used primarily for video games and CD+G Karaoke Files.

The CAD file format used by Creo Elements / Direct Modeling Express uses a .pk2 extension. Direct Modelling Express is the free version of Creo Elements / Direct Modelling, and likely uses the same format but with additional encryption or obfuscation to prevent data sharing. The .pk2 files can not be read by the paid version of Creo Elements / Direct Modeling.

Archive formats
Filename extensions